The Maio Super Cup (Capeverdean Creole: Super Taça de Djarmai) is a regional super cup competition played during the season in Maio Island, Cape Verde. The competition is organized by the Maio Regional Football Association (Associação Regional do Maio de Futebol, ARMF). Its current champions is Académico 83 do Porto Inglês. The regional champion competes with the cup champion. If a champion also has a cup title, a cup club who is runner-up qualifies. The 2018 season will feature the champion Barreirense and Onze Unidos, without a status until the April 7 cup final.

The first edition took place in 2008.

Winners

1Runner up in the cup final as the regional cup winner was also the regional champion that season

Performance By Club

See also
Maio Island Cup
Maio Premier Division
Maio Opening Tournament

Notes

References

Sport in Maio, Cape Verde
Football cup competitions in Cape Verde
2008 establishments in Cape Verde